In typography, a fat face letterform is a serif typeface or piece of lettering in the Didone or modern style with an extremely bold design. Fat face typefaces appeared in London around 1805–1810 and became widely popular; John Lewis describes the fat face as "the first real display typeface."

While decorated typefaces and lettering styles existed in the past, for instance inline and shadowed forms, the fat faces' extreme design and their issue in very large poster sizes had an immediate impact on display typography in the early nineteenth century. Historian James Mosley describes a fat face as "designed like a naval broadside to sock its commercial message...by sheer aggressive weight of heavy metal." and that (unlike slab serif typefaces) "while the thick lines were very thick, the thin ones remained the same - or in proportion, very thin indeed."

The same style of letters was also widely used executed as custom lettering rather than as a typeface in the nineteenth century, in architecture, on tombstones and on signage. Versions were executed as roman or upright, italics and with designs inside the main bold strokes of the letter, such as a white line, patterns or decorations such as fruits or flowers. They are different in style to the slab serif typefaces which appeared shortly afterwards, in which the serifs themselves are also made bold in weight.

Historical background

Great changes took place in the style of printed letters available from type foundries in the hundred years after 1750. At the beginning of this period, fonts in Latin-alphabet printing were predominantly intended for book printing. The modern concept of text faces having companion bold fonts did not exist, although some titling capitals were quite bold; if a bolder effect was intended blackletter might be used.

From the arrival of roman type around 1475 to the late eighteenth century, relatively little development in letter design took place, as most fonts of the period were intended for body text, and they stayed relatively similar in design, generally ignoring local styles of lettering or newer "pointed-pen" styles of calligraphy.

Starting in the late seventeenth century, typefounders developed what are now called transitional and then Didone types. These typefaces had daringly slender horizontals and serif details, catching up to the steely calligraphy and copperplate engraving styles of the period, that could show off the increasingly high quality of paper and printing technology of the period. In addition, Didone typefaces had a strictly vertical stress: without exception, the vertical lines were thicker than the horizontals, creating a much more geometric and modular design.

A major development of the early nineteenth century was the arrival of the printed poster and increasing use of printing for publicity and advertising material. This presumably caused a desire to make eye-catching new types of letters available for printing. Large typefaces clearly intended for poster use began to appear in London in the second half of the eighteenth century, introduced by the typefounders Thomas Cottrell and by William Caslon II by 1764, although casting large metal type in sand for book titles was used for centuries before that. Caslon's were apparently marketed for use by stagecoach services, with lists of towns on the specimen sheets. Although influenced by a textbook on architectural lettering, they still remained similar to magnified body text forms, rather than a new departure, although they did establish one precedent later followed by both fat face typefaces and modern face types generally, that numerals were at a fixed height rather than the old text figures of variable height.

The term "fat face" itself is older than the modern genre. Meaning typefaces bolder than normal weight (but only slighly, by modern standards) it was used in 1683 by Joseph Moxon as "a broad-stemmed letter". Reference books on printing from the nineteenth century also used it to refer to new Didone typefaces that were bolder than before but still intended for printing body text or poetry.

First appearances
According to Mosley, "the growth [of fat face letters] from existing models can be continuously traced. There is a clear parallel to it in contemporary architectural lettering...in printing types its fatness was steadily increased".

Two contemporary sources concurred that fat face letters were popularised by the typefounder Robert Thorne. He had been an apprentice to Thomas Cottrell, who pioneered large-size poster types, before setting up his own company, often called the Fann Street Foundry, in North London. According to Hansard (1825), "the extremely bold and fat letter, now prevalent in job-printing, owes its introduction principally to Mr. Thorne, a spirited and successful letter-founder" and according to William Savage (1822) he "has been principally instrumental in the revolution that has taken place in Posting Bills by the introduction of fat types." Unfortunately few typeface specimen books from the period survive, making it difficult to confirm this. Sébastien Morlighem, based on study of specimen books, is not convinced that the escalating trend was entirely driven by Thorne: "a lesser-known, yet decisive, contribution came from the Caslon foundry" and that "it is more accurate to see that several people – punchcutters, founders, printers, publishers – were involved in its development and popularisation".

As to the clients for these types, Mosley writes that "it is tempting to see" the lottery agent Thomas Bish as a force behind them: the two Thomas Bishes, a father and son who were famous lottery promoters, were well-known for brash, startling advertising; Mosley highlights as significant a fat face in a later specimen book simply showcased with the single specimen word "Bish", and notes that Bish's posters began with "heavy roman lettering engraved on wood, for which fat-face types were substituted as they became available".

Widespread use

Fat faces rapidly became popular. Whereas early poster types and titling capitals were generally only upright, fat faces were made in roman and in italics. Swash capitals for A M N V W Y were quite common; the sample text "VANWAYMAN" was used as a sample text by the Caslon type foundry to showcase them. They were also down into quite small sizes.

Fat faces were also used in the USA, where they were used on gravestones. In the United States Barnhurst and Nerone comment that fat face newspaper nameplates were in fashion in the 1810s; later they were often replaced by blackletter.

Mosley has particularly praised those of Vincent Figgins' foundry (digitised by Matthew Carter as Elephant, above): "exaggeration puts a huge strain on the designer if the result is to retain any coherence at all. Whoever cut the fat-faces of Vincent Figgins...handled the problems with what can only be described as elegance." New varieties were added by type foundries, including condensed, wide and contra-italic versions. Other display typefaces also proliferated following their lead; reverse-contrast typefaces, introduced by 1821, may be seen as an inversion of the style.

Ornamented designs

Besides simple typefaces, variants were designed with patterns and decorations. These extended from simple inline designs to artwork such as flowers and harvest themes. Decorated fat face typefaces were cut in wood and reproduced by dabbing, or stereotype, a technique in which the wooden pattern is driven into molten metal just at the point of solidifying.

One type foundry particularly known for decorated designs was the London foundry of Louis John Pouchée, active from 1818 to 1830. Pouchée was a Freemason, and some of his foundry's wood patterns for dabbing, many of which survive, were inspired by Masonic emblems. While very striking, it is not clear that these types were much used: John Dreyfus reported that "the late Ellic Howe, a printing historian and a Freemason, failed to discover any piece of printing on which Pouchée's Masonic types were used". He suggested that the fine detail of Pouchée's ornamented letters was not practical for job printing work at the time and that some of the designs were too large for playbills and handbills, their likely market. Ultimately large metal types were only briefly used, as they were soon replaced by routed and pantograph-engraved wood display type, which was much lighter and cheaper.

Bold lettering also appears on copperplate engraving, such as engraved maps of the period. Digital font designer Andy Clymer reports finding on engraved maps that it was more common for bold lettering to be decorated, leaving spaces not engraved out, than it was to be solid black: "whenever things would get heavier, they would often just get more ornamented…not filled in solid [but] with some kind of ornamentation or decoration." This is seen in A Specimen of the Print Hands, an internal specimen of lettering styles used by the Ordnance Survey in the early nineteenth century, in which the boldest lettering is decorated.

Late nineteenth century
New types of display type proliferated in the late nineteenth century.  In 1863, printer H. Morgan in Madras wrote that fat-face letter "is seldom used now". In 1901 the influential American printer Theodore Low De Vinne criticised the style as "an object lesson of absurdity".

The term "fat face" continued to be used for bolder types, not just for the ultra-bold poster types. In 1893 William B. MacKellar of the major American type foundry MacKellar, Smiths, & Jordan showed a wide body text face described as a fat face in discussing pay scales for compositors.

Twentieth century and later

Fat faces returned to some popularity in the twentieth century, in the UK as part of the Victoriana style promoted by John Betjeman and others in the 1930s. Post-nineteenth century fat face fonts include:
 Ultra Bodoni by Morris Fuller Benton at American Type Founders.
 Falstaff by Monotype
 Normande by Berthold
 Thorowgood by Linotype.
Digital period fat faces include:
 Elephant/Big Figgins by Matthew Carter (1992, in 1998 rereleased under the second name in an expanded family)
 Surveyor and Obsidian, published by Hoefler & Co.
 Brunel and Isambard by Barnes & Christian Schwartz (Although not a fat face, topping out in a bold weight, Barnes' Chiswick is inspired by vernacular letterforms preceding them, with a wide range of alternates based on lettering of the period.)

Notes

References

Sources

Cited literature

 

Modern serif typefaces
1810s in London
Display typefaces